La Villa-Basílica is station along Line 6 of the Mexico City Metro.
Its logo is the  façade of the nearby Basilica of Our Lady of Guadalupe.

The station serves the Colonia Aragón and Colonia La Villa neighborhoods.  It opened on 8 July 1986.

Ridership

References

External links
 

Mexico City Metro Line 6 stations
Railway stations opened in 1986
1986 establishments in Mexico
Mexico City Metro stations in Gustavo A. Madero, Mexico City